Shehu Usman Abubakar (c. 1938 – May 27, 2014) was a Nigerian traditional leader who served as the 10th Emir of Gombe from January 1984 until his death in May 2014. Abubakar spearheaded the creation of Gombe State, one of Nigeria's 36 states, in 1996. He was also the Chairman of the Council of Emirs and Chiefs since 1984.

Early life and education
Abubakar was born in the Doma area of Gombe in 1938. He was the fifth son of the 9th Emir of Gombe, Mallam Abubakar Umar. He attended  Elementary School and Bauchi Middle School. Abubakar graduated from the Barewa College, Zaria, secondary school in 1966.

Career
Abubakar began his professional career at the former Gombe Native Authority as an engineering assistant. He then worked at the Technical Training Centre, Kaduna Institute of Administration. Abubakar also joined the staff of two former northern Nigerian state governments: the former North-Eastern State government and the government of the now-defunct Bauchi State, where he became the Permanent Secretary of Parastatals, Local governments, Animals, Forestry and Establishment.

He also served as the permanent secretary and two-time member of the National Universities Commission (NUC).

Personal life
Emir Shehu Abubakar died at Royal Marsden Hospital, Fulham Road, London, where he had been undergoing treatment for cancer, on May 27, 2014, at the age of 76. He was buried on the grounds of the Gombe palace.

The late Shehu Abubakar's son, Abubakar Shehu-Abubakar, was appointed as the new Emir of Gombe in early June 2014.

References

1930s births
2014 deaths
Emirs of Gombe
Nigerian royalty
People from Gombe State
Barewa College alumni